Eternally Even is the second solo album by My Morning Jacket frontman Jim James, first available as an advance stream on NPR First Listen on October 27 and released on November 4, 2016.

Track listing

Reception

Rolling Stone gave the album 3.5 out of 5 stars.

Personnel
Adapted from All About Jazz.

 Jim James - vocals, bass, guitar, keyboards, organ, programming, synthesizer
 Chris "Daddy" Dave - drums, percussion
 David Stephen Givan - drums, percussion 
 Shungudzo Kuyimba - vocals 
 Joseph Lorge - background vocals 
 Blake Mills - bass, drums, synthesizer
 Rob Moose - strings, synthesizer 
 Kevin Ratterman - programming, synthesizer 
 Brian Reitzell - drums 
 Joan Shelley - vocals

Charts

References

2016 albums
ATO Records albums
Jim James albums
Capitol Records albums
Albums produced by Blake Mills